Jeffrey Michael Fisher (born February 25, 1958) is an American football coach and former cornerback and return specialist. He served as a head coach in the National Football League (NFL) for 22 seasons, primarily with the Houston / Tennessee Oilers / Titans franchise. He coached the Oilers / Titans from 1994 to 2010 and the St. Louis / Los Angeles Rams from 2012 to 2016.

After playing college football at University of Southern California, he was drafted in the seventh round of the 1981 NFL Draft by the Chicago Bears, and played with the Bears for five seasons. He won a Super Bowl ring in 1985 while on injured reserve during his final season as a player.

Fisher then held several coaching positions for various teams before becoming the head coach of the Titans towards the end of the 1994 season during their tenure as the Houston Oilers and was the team's first coach when they relocated to Tennessee. He continued to coach the Titans until after the end of the 2010 season when the Titans and Fisher mutually agreed to part ways. Following a season away from football, Fisher was hired as the head coach of the Rams in 2012 and coached the team during their last four years in St. Louis. He remained the head coach of the Rams during the franchise's return to Los Angeles in 2016, but was fired near the end of the season.

Fisher's most successful season was in 1999, when he led the Titans to the franchise's first (and only) Super Bowl appearance in XXXIV, which ended in close defeat by the St. Louis Rams for their first Super Bowl title. However, despite compiling a winning record as a head coach, Fisher's career has been noted for an overall lack of success, having only obtained six winning seasons and postseason appearances in over two decades in the NFL. He holds the record for the most regular-season losses by an NFL head coach at 165, tied with Dan Reeves.

Early life
A native of Southern California, Fisher played Pop Warner football as a member of the Reseda Rams and was 2-way starter on their championship team in 1972. He then starred as a high school All-American wide receiver at Taft High School in Woodland Hills.

Playing career
Fisher went on to star at USC, under coach John Robinson. During his collegiate career (1977–80), he played alongside such defensive stars as Ronnie Lott, Dennis Smith, and Joey Browner. Fisher's USC teammates also included star offensive lineman Bruce Matthews, whom he would coach years later with the Oilers and Titans. Fisher and the Trojans won a national championship during the 1978 season, and in 1980 he was honored as a Pac-10 All-Academic selection.

Fisher was drafted in the seventh round of the 1981 NFL Draft by the Chicago Bears. He appeared in 49 games as a defensive back and return specialist in his five seasons with the Bears.

Fisher had a key performance in the Bears' 1981 Week 14 contest against the Minnesota Vikings. Entering the game, the 7–6 Vikings were fighting for the NFC Central title while the Bears were 3–10. In the 4th quarter, Fisher made a leaping interception at the line of scrimmage and then clinched Chicago's win by recovering a free kick after an intentional safety by the Bears, sealing a 10–9 win.

In 1983, Fisher suffered a broken leg on a punt return when he was tackled by then-Philadelphia Eagles linebacker Bill Cowher. Coincidentally the two would become rivals as head coaches beginning in the AFC Central in 1995; Fisher's Oilers/Titans squads had an 11–7 record against Cowher's Pittsburgh Steelers. In 1984, he set a Bears franchise record with eight punt returns in a single game against Detroit, helping him tie Lew Barnes's club record of 57 returns in a single season. Fisher earned a Super Bowl ring after Chicago's 1985 Super Bowl season, despite spending the year on injured reserve with an ankle injury that prematurely ended his playing career. Fisher stayed with the Bears as a defensive assistant while on injured reserve for the season.

Early coaching career
During 1985, Fisher used his time on the Bears' injured reserve to assist defensive coordinator Buddy Ryan. After the Bears won the Super Bowl that season, Ryan was hired as head coach of the Philadelphia Eagles and Fisher joined as a defensive backs coach. In 1988, Fisher was promoted to defensive coordinator at age 30, the youngest such coach in the league. The 1989 Eagles defense led the NFL in interceptions (30) and sacks (62). The 1990 squad led the league in rushing defense and finished second in sacks.

In 1991, Fisher was hired as defensive coordinator for the Los Angeles Rams, which reunited him with his college coach John Robinson. The next two seasons, he served as the defensive backs coach for the San Francisco 49ers. These years as an assistant to George Seifert placed Fisher in the Bill Walsh coaching tree. On February 9, 1994, Fisher again became a defensive coordinator, this time for the Houston Oilers under Jack Pardee. Fisher had succeeded Ryan, who left the post to become the head coach of the Arizona Cardinals.

Head coach

Houston / Tennessee Oilers / Titans (1994–2010)

On November 14, 1994, Pardee was fired, and Fisher was promoted to replace him for the last six games of the season. The Oilers retained Fisher as head coach, and the Oilers drafted quarterback Steve McNair in the 1995 NFL Draft. The new coach did not disappoint, leading the team to a 7–9 record in 1995, tied for second place in the division. The following year, the Oilers added Heisman Trophy winner Eddie George, and they achieved an 8–8 record. However, an inability to get a new stadium deal in Houston caused owner Bud Adams to relocate the team to Tennessee for the 1997 season.

In the team's first two seasons in Tennessee the Oilers compiled a record of 16–16. In 1998, the team's home games moved from Memphis to Nashville.

In the 1999 season, the newly renamed Tennessee Titans finished with a 13–3 regular season record, going all the way to Super Bowl XXXIV, in part due to the Music City Miracle. The Titans fell to the St. Louis Rams, 23–16; wideout Kevin Dyson was tackled one yard short of the end zone with no time remaining, in what became known as "The Tackle". Tennessee achieved the same record the next year, but were defeated in the AFC playoffs by the Baltimore Ravens who would go on to win Super Bowl XXXV.

The 2001 season was a disappointing one for the Titans, as they could only muster a 7–9 showing. The beginning of the next season proved to be even worse, with the franchise starting off with a 1–4 record. Following one home loss, owner Bud Adams made the comment to reporters that perhaps the Titans "were getting outcoached." This provided a spark the team needed, and they finished the season with an 11–5 record and made it to the AFC Championship Game.

The 2003 season saw more success, with yet another trip to the playoffs and McNair tying for the League MVP award (with Peyton Manning). Again, they lost to the eventual Super Bowl champions, the New England Patriots, but the team's progress did not go unnoticed. The 2004 season, however, was plagued by injuries from the start, and they finished at 5–11. Following the season, many veteran players (such as Samari Rolle and Derrick Mason) were cut in an effort to comply with the strict salary cap. The relative youth of the team resulted in a disappointing 2005 season as well. Before the 2005 season, Fisher hired Norm Chow out of USC to be his offensive coordinator.

In 2006, the Titans finished a better-than-expected 8–8.  Quarterback Steve McNair was traded to the Baltimore Ravens and Vince Young was drafted, but began the season as backup to Billy Volek and Kerry Collins. The season began slowly at 0–3 before Volek was replaced by Kerry Collins and, later, Young. The team ultimately started 2–7, but following a 27–26 loss to the Baltimore Ravens and McNair, the Titans erupted to win six straight games under Young, including a 24-point rally to beat the New York Giants.  With this promising record the Titans exercised their right to extend his contract by a year, keeping him as the head coach through the 2007 NFL season.

In 2007, he led the Titans to a 10–6 record and made the AFC playoffs as the 6th seed, but lost in the opening round to the San Diego Chargers.

In 2008, Fisher led the Titans to a 10–0 undefeated streak only to be upset by Brett Favre and the New York Jets midway through the 2008 season. The Titans finished 13–3 and secured the number 1 seed in the AFC, yet lost in the second round of the 2008 NFL Playoffs to the Baltimore Ravens.

In 2009 the Titans lost in overtime to the Pittsburgh Steelers in the season's opening game. The loss began a six-game slide that reached its nadir in a 59–0 slaughter by the New England Patriots.  Collins, at the public recommendation of Titans owner Bud Adams, was benched and replaced by Young; the Titans responded by winning eight of their next ten games, highlighted by a dramatic comeback victory over the Arizona Cardinals, a season-ending comeback against the Seattle Seahawks, and a hard-fought overtime win over the Miami Dolphins. Highlighting this season was the play of running back Chris Johnson; in his second year of professional football (he'd been drafted 24th in the 2008 NFL Draft) Johnson broke Marshall Faulk's NFL record for total yards from scrimmage with 2,509 and became the sixth back in NFL history to rush over 2,000 yards.

In 2010, relations between Fisher and Vince Young became increasingly strained. In a home game against the Washington Redskins, Young was removed following an injury to his thumb and subsequently not allowed to re-enter the game. In disgust, he began removing his equipment while still on the sidelines, eventually throwing his shoulder pads into the stands. He walked off of the field as the contest continued. Young never appeared in another game for the Titans and was released at the end of the season.

Initially it appeared that Fisher's tenure with the Titans would survive this situation; however, on January 27, 2011, almost four weeks after the end of the 2010 regular season, it was formally announced that Fisher and the Titans had mutually agreed to part ways following a buyout of the one remaining season on Fisher's contract. At more than 16 full seasons, Fisher had been the longest-tenured NFL head coach with one team among active head coaches.

St. Louis / Los Angeles Rams (2012–2016)

After a season off in 2011, Fisher agreed to become the head coach of the St. Louis Rams on January 13, 2012.

In Fisher's first season in St. Louis, the team finished with a 7–8–1 record, a five–win improvement from the previous year.

In 2013, the Rams finished with a 7–9 record.

During the 2014 season, the Rams went 6–10. It was the team's worst record under Fisher, and also Fisher's 4th consecutive losing season as a head coach. In the team's final season in St. Louis in 2015 they finished with a 7–9 record.

The Rams started the 2016 season 3–1 but lost 6 of their next 7 games leading up to the Rams' announcement, on December 4, that they had signed him to a two-year contract extension through 2018; however, just over a week later, on December 12, the Rams fired Fisher following a 42–14 loss to the eventual NFC champion Atlanta Falcons in which they were held scoreless until scoring 2 meaningless touchdowns in the 4th quarter. This loss helped him tie the record for the most regular season losses of any NFL Coach of all time.

Michigan Panthers
On January 27, 2022, it was announced that Fisher would become the Head coach and General manager of the Michigan Panthers of the United States Football League, becoming Fisher's first head coaching job in six years. 

On February 3, 2023, the USFL announced that Fisher had been replaced as head coach by Mike Nolan, citing only "personal reasons," a boilerplate statement the league had recycled from Kirby Wilson's departure from the Pittsburgh Maulers two weeks prior. He went 2-8 (.200) in his tenure as Panthers head coach.

Head coaching record

NFL 

* – Interim head coach

USFL

Competition committee

Fisher was co-chair of the NFL competition committee along with Atlanta Falcons President Rich McKay until his resignation in August 2016.

Personal life
Fisher has three children. One son, Brandon, played linebacker for the University of Montana and was a defensive backs coach for the Rams on his father’s staff. Another son, Trent, was a defensive back at Auburn University.

See also

 List of National Football League head coaches with 50 wins

References

External links
 Los Angeles Rams bio  
 

1958 births
Living people
American football cornerbacks
American football return specialists
Chicago Bears players
Chicago Bears coaches
Houston Oilers coaches
Houston Oilers head coaches
Los Angeles Rams coaches
Los Angeles Rams head coaches
Philadelphia Eagles coaches
San Francisco 49ers coaches
St. Louis Rams head coaches
Tennessee Oilers head coaches
Tennessee Titans head coaches
USC Trojans football players
People from Culver City, California
Players of American football from California
Sportspeople from Los Angeles County, California
William Howard Taft Charter High School alumni
Michigan Panthers (2022) coaches